Mark Clougherty (born 20 September 1951) is a Scottish retired footballer.

Clougherty began his career with East Fife, before moving to Falkirk in 1976. A year later, he joined Clyde, making over 100 appearances for the Shawfield club in 3 years, before joining Dumbarton in 1980. He spent the rest of his career with the Sons, making over 250 appearances in 8 years.

Honours
Dumbarton
Stirlingshire Cup : 1987-88

External links
 

Living people
1951 births
Scottish footballers
East Fife F.C. players
Falkirk F.C. players
Clyde F.C. players
Dumbarton F.C. players
Scottish Football League players
Scottish football managers
Dumbarton F.C. managers
Scottish Football League managers
Footballers from Glasgow
Association football defenders